Chandra Rajeshwara Rao (June 6, 1914 – April 9, 1994) was an Indian communist politician. He was one of the leaders of the Telangana Rebellion (1946–1951). He also worked as Communist Party of India (CPI) general secretary for 28 years before giving up the post in 1992 due to health reasons.

Life
Rao came from an affluent peasant family. He was born on June 6, 1914 in Mangalapuram village, Krishna district of Andhra Pradesh State, India. He received his medical education at Banaras Hindu University in Varanasi and at a medical college in Vishakhapatnam. He joined the Communist Party of India (CPI) in 1931. Rao was vice-chairman of the All-India Kisan Sabha (Peasants’ League) in 1954 and 1955. In December 1964 he was elected general secretary of the National Council of the CPI. He was awarded the Order of Lenin in 1974.

His son, Chandra Chandrasekhar, and grandson, Chandra Jaideep are involved in politics in Andhra Pradesh.

In Telangana armed struggle

Crisis was developing to a pitch in the state of Hyderabad in 1946.. In such situation, Andhra Mahasabha and CPI decided to resort to armed struggle as the people had no other option. The CPI leadership under PC Joshi gave the green signal for armed struggle against Nizam’s rule, aiming to overthrow it.
The struggle lasted from 1946 to 1948. In the meantime India achieved independence, and it was a Communist who hoisted the Tricolour in Hyderabad city. But the Nizam refused to join India. Negotiations with Indian government were on for its merger with the country.
In the meantime, in the second congress of CPI in February 1948 in Calcutta, a left sectarian and adventurist leadership came to lead CPI giving a call for the overthrow of Nehru government, and also removed PC Joshi. It was in this congress that BT Ranadive became the general secretary of the party.
He at this time was one of the major leaders of the armed struggle in Telangana. Though he and others from Andhra did not agree with everything BTR said, he went along with the line of armed struggle. He was elected to the central committee in 1948 as a new member, but contrary to common impression, not to the politburo. There was a difference between the so called ‘Russian line’ and the ‘Chinese line’ in the debates, but both came together on the question of armed struggle.

By then, Indian forces had entered Hyderabad state on September 13, 1948, overthrowing the Nizam, and merging the state with India. Certain concessions were also given to peasants. Thus, the main aims of the armed struggle were fulfilled. The struggle should have been withdrawn at this point. But the central leadership thought otherwise.
By 1950, the disastrous results of the ‘line’ were clear to everybody. A Central Committee meeting held in Calcutta in June 1950 replaced the BTR leadership and elected C Rajeswara Rao as the general secretary of the party. He was the main author of the new ‘Andhra line’.
But it did not solve the crisis and soon it was realized that this line too was wrong. Accordingly, a four member CPI delegation went to Soviet Union to meet Stalin and discuss strategy and tactics. It included CR; the other members were SA Dange, Basavpunnaiah and Ajoy Ghosh. On return, drafts of Party program and policy statement were published in April 1951. A special underground party conference in Calcutta in 1951 elected a new leadership with Ajoy Ghosh as the general secretary.

References

External links
 Chandra Rajeswara Rao Foundation Kondapur Hyderabad
 60th Anniversary Telangana Rebellion

Telangana Rebellion
People from Nalgonda
Communist Party of India politicians from Andhra Pradesh
1914 births
1994 deaths
Indian independence activists